Luliconazole, trade names Luzu among others, is an imidazole antifungal medication. As a 1% topical cream, It is indicated for the treatment of athlete's foot, jock itch, and ringworm caused by dermatophytes such as Trichophyton rubrum, Microsporum gypseum and ''Epidermophyton floccosum.

References

External links
 
 Luliconazole

Dithiolanes
Nitriles
Chlorobenzenes
Antifungals
Fungicides
Lanosterol 14α-demethylase inhibitors